The 1975 Cupa României Final was the 37th final of Romania's most prestigious football cup competition. It was disputed between Rapid București and Universitatea Craiova, and was won by Rapid București after a game with 3 goals, in extra time. It was the 9th cup for Rapid București.

Rapid București became the fourth club representing Divizia B which won the Romanian Cup final, after Metalul Reșița in 1954, Arieșul Turda in 1961 and Chimia Râmnicu Vâlcea in 1973.

Match details

See also 
List of Cupa României finals

References

External links
Romaniansoccer.ro

Cupa

1975
Romania
FC Rapid București matches
CS Universitatea Craiova matches